Jack Maguire (born July 6, 1994) is an American professional golfer.

Maguire played college golf at Florida State University, where he won two events in his freshman year. His 70.78 scoring average is the lowest in Seminoles program history.

Maguire also holds the record for lowest round in Florida State history with a 10 under 62 at the USF Invitational. 

Maguire qualified for the 2015 U.S. Open by earning medalist honors at sectional qualifying in Jupiter, Florida along with Luke Donald and Andy Pope. He finished tied for 58th at the tournament.

Maguire made his professional debut at the 2016 Phoenix Open. He missed the cut, despite making a hole-in-one on TPC Scottsdale's 12th hole during his second round. He played the rest of 2016 on the Web.com Tour, finishing 47th, which allowed him to retain full Web.com Tour status for 2017. In 2017, Maguire finished 93rd on the Web.com Tour and lost his exempt status. Following 2018, he advanced through qualifying school and then finished T-34 in the Web.com Tour qualifying tournament, where the top-40 and ties gained tour status.

Amateur wins
2012 St Augustine Amateur
2014 USF Invitational, Mason Rudolph Championship

Source:

Results in major championships

CUT = missed the half-way cut
"T" = tied for place

U.S. national team appearances
Amateur
Palmer Cup: 2014, 2015 (winners)

References

External links

American male golfers
Florida State Seminoles men's golfers
Golfers from Florida
1994 births
Living people